Dark Nemesis is a supervillain team appearing in American comic books published by DC Comics.

Publication history
Dark Nemesis first appeared in Teen Titans (vol. 2) #7 and was created by Dan Jurgens.

Fictional team biography
Dark Nemesis is a high-powered group who will work for anyone that will pay them. They first came in conflict with the Teen Titans when they were contracted by the Veil as a way to test the Titans' abilities. After the battle, only Scorcher was the one who evaded capture.

Scorcher later orchestrated a prison break. During the breakout, Risk detected a psychic connection with Scorcher alerting them that she was a H'San Natall offspring. She was abandoned by her teammates. Before she can rendezvous with them, she saves the lives of Atom and Risk. Axis also detects Scorcher's link with the H'San Natall race.

When Dark Nemesis was under the employ of the Veil again, they killed Scorcher and framed Risk for her murder. Even though the Titans had been discredited, they were able to find evidence to prove Risk's innocence.

A mysterious boss later hires the Dark Nemesis to acquire a diet substance named Apex. They gain a new Scorcher as the replacement for the former Scorcher that they killed. Before they could acquire the files on Apex, they were easily taken down by a refocused Titans.

During the "Infinite Crisis" storyline, Vault appeared as members of Alexander Luthor, Jr.'s Secret Society of Super Villains. Blizard was also a member of that group as he was seen partaking in the Battle of Metropolis.

Membership
 Axis - The blue-skinned leader of Dark Nemesis. She is a ruthless and cunning psi-warrior who can detect weaknesses and compromises their ability to fight.
 Blizard - A reptilian man in an armor with a dome helmet who possesses extreme cold-based powers. Not much is known about him except that he was in a special orphanage with Scorcher.
 Carom - A speed demon who ricochets off walls at amazing speed.
 Scorcher I - A H'San Natall/human hybrid who has heat-based powers that are a counterpoint of Blizzard's powers.
 Scorcher II - She has the same powers as the original Scorcher.
 Vault - Axis's lover. Using energy-matter transference, Vault can create individual prisons that cancel out an opponent's power. Even though he is mute, he follows Axis's orders.

References

External links
 Dark Nemesis at DC Comics Wiki
 Dark Nemesis at Comic Vine
 

Comics characters introduced in 1997
Characters created by Dan Jurgens